Kingsley Wong Kwok  (born 1968) is a Hong Kong FTU politician who is the chairman of the Hong Kong Federation of Trade Unions.

He has been one of the members of the Legislative Council of Hong Kong for the Election Committee constituency which was newly created under the 2021 Hong Kong electoral changes.

In July 2022, he tested positive for COVID-19, one day after taking photos with Chief Executive John Lee during the first "antechamber chat"; he also met with Paul Lam and Horace Cheung, and sat next to Maggie Chan Man-ki and Peter Koon Ho-ming. Wong began self-isolation rather than government quarantine.

In October 2022, Wong said that directorate-levels Civil Servants should not be allowed to have dual nationality, saying that even if they take an oath of loyalty to the Hong Kong government, it might not be enough to eliminate their divided loyalties.

Electoral history

References 

Living people
1968 births
HK LegCo Members 2022–2025
Hong Kong pro-Beijing politicians